Heteropsis antahala is a butterfly in the family Nymphalidae. It is found on Madagascar. The habitat consists of forest margins.

References

Elymniini
Butterflies described in 1872
Endemic fauna of Madagascar
Butterflies of Africa
Taxa named by Christopher Ward (entomologist)